Acca (or Ecca; died  764) was an eighth-century Bishop of Hereford, England. He was consecrated between 747 and 758 and died between 758 and 770.

Citations

References

External links
 

Bishops of Hereford
8th-century English bishops
8th-century deaths
Year of birth unknown